Daghleh    (also Daghle) is a village in Akkar Governorate, Lebanon.

The population of Daghle is mostly Sunni and Shia Muslims.

History
In 1838, Eli Smith noted  the place as ed-Dughleh,  located west of esh-Sheikh Mohammed. The  residents were Alawites.

References

Bibliography

External links
Daghleh, Localiban 

Populated places in Akkar District
Sunni Muslim communities in Lebanon
Shia Muslim communities in Lebanon